The Round Rock Express are a Minor League Baseball team of the Pacific Coast League (PCL) and the Triple-A affiliate of the Texas Rangers. They are located in Round Rock, Texas, and play their home games at the Dell Diamond. The team is named for Baseball Hall of Famer Nolan Ryan, who was nicknamed "The Ryan Express." Ryan, along with son Reid Ryan and Don Sanders make up the team's ownership group, Ryan Sanders Baseball.

The Express were established as a Double-A team of the Texas League (TL) in 2000. They won the Texas League championship in 2000. Round Rock was replaced by a Triple-A Pacific Coast League team in 2005. The Triple-A Express carried on the history of the Double-A team that preceded them. With Major League Baseball's restructuring of Minor League Baseball in 2021, the Express were shifted to the Triple-A West, which was renamed the PCL in 2022.

History
The ownership group led by Nolan Ryan and Don Sanders began its operations in Round Rock in 2000 as the Dell Diamond opened, moving the Double-A Texas League's Jackson Generals to the new park, affiliating with the Houston Astros and setting attendance records for the Double-A level. By 2003, Corpus Christi had offered the Ryan-Sanders group $20 million to build a stadium and move a professional franchise there, and the ownership group was convinced Round Rock could support Triple-A baseball.

Meanwhile, the Pacific Coast League's Edmonton Trappers franchise, left isolated by the departure of the Calgary Cannons after the 2002 season for Albuquerque, was under pressure from the rest of the league to relocate to the United States. After the 2003 season, the Ryan group purchased the Trappers franchise with plans to relocate that franchise to Round Rock for 2005, once the Corpus Christi stadium would be ready for the Double-A franchise. The Triple-A club would carry on the Round Rock Express identity; the Double-A club would become the Corpus Christi Hooks, and the Ryan group was able to negotiate an affiliation swap with the New Orleans Zephyrs to obtain the Astros' Triple-A affiliation for the newly-arriving PCL club.

In 2006, the Round Rock Express clinched the Southern Division of the league's American Conference with a win–loss record of 85–59. After defeating the Nashville Sounds in five games to take the American Conference championship, they advanced to the PCL championship series, but lost to the Tucson Sidewinders in three straight games.

In 2011, after 6 seasons of serving as the Triple-A affiliate of the Houston Astros, and 11 seasons of being affiliated with the Astros overall, the Express became the Triple-A affiliate of the Texas Rangers. Through the end of the 2018 season, attendance figures have dropped 8% since changing affiliations from Houston to Texas (see table below). Each of the top 9 season attendances all occurred in the 11 seasons the team was affiliated with Houston.

In 2016, Forbes listed the Express as the sixth-most valuable Minor League Baseball team with a value of $40 million.

On September 20, 2018, the Express announced a 4-year Player Development Contract with the Houston Astros. In conjunction with Major League Baseball's reorganization of the minors after the 2020 season, the Astros opted to discontinue their affiliation with Round Rock, leaving them in need of a new major league affiliate.

The Express later re-affiliated with the Texas Rangers for 2021 and were organized into the Triple-A West. Round Rock ended the season tied for second place in the Eastern Division with a 61–58 record. No playoffs were held to determine a league champion; instead, the team with the best regular-season record was declared the winner. However, 10 games that had been postponed from the start of the season were reinserted into the schedule as a postseason tournament called the Triple-A Final Stretch in which all 30 Triple-A clubs competed for the highest winning percentage. Round Rock finished the tournament tied for seventh place with a 6–4 record. In 2022, the Triple-A West became known as the Pacific Coast League, the name historically used by the regional circuit prior to the 2021 reorganization.

Season-by-season records

Dell Diamond attendance

Season average attendance

Attendance ranking by affiliation (through 2018)

Roster

Notable alumni
Josh Banks (born 1982), MLB pitcher
Richard Bleier (born 1987), MLB pitcher
John Buck, MLB catcher
Roger Clemens (born 1962), MLB pitcher
Chris Davis, MLB first baseman
Morgan Ensberg, MLB third baseman
Mike Gallo, MLB pitcher
Craig Gentry, MLB outfielder
Keith Ginter, MLB onfielder
Jason Hirsh, MLB pitcher
Roy Oswalt, MLB pitcher
Humberto Quintero, MLB catcher
Taylor Teagarden, MLB catcher
Hunter Pence, MLB outfielder
Willy Taveras, MLB outfielder
José Urquidy, MLB pitcher

Popular culture
The "Play Ball" episode of The Simple Life, a reality television series starring young wealthy socialites Paris Hilton and Nicole Richie, took place during an Express game. The show aired on July 21, 2004, as the 15th episode of the show's second season.

The team made headlines in 2010 when it "signed" Billy Ray "Rojo" Johnson, described in a press release as an East Texan who grew up in Venezuela and had run-ins with the law. In reality, Johnson was actor Will Ferrell, who briefly took the mound at Dell Diamond to promote his nearby charity golf tournament.

References

External links

Official website

 
Pacific Coast League teams
Texas League teams
Sports in Austin, Texas
Professional baseball teams in Texas
Texas Rangers minor league affiliates
Houston Astros minor league affiliates
Baseball teams established in 2000
Round Rock, Texas
2000 establishments in Texas
Triple-A West teams